Catherine Steadman is a British actress and author.

Career
Steadman trained at the Oxford School of Drama and made her screen debut playing Julia Bertram in Mansfield Park. Since then she has appeared in television series such as The Tudors, The Inbetweeners, Fresh Meat, Midsomer Murders and Trying Again. Some of her more notable roles include Nurse Wilson in ITV's Breathless, Mabel Lane Fox in Downton Abbey, Maggie Lewis in Tutankhamun, Gemma in BBC Four's Bucket, Mrs Forbes in Victoria and Eliza Gestalt in The Rook.

On stage, she has appeared in the West End in Polly Stenham's award-winning That Face, the Royal Shakespeare Company's Oppenheimer (for which she was nominated for a Laurence Olivier Award for Best Supporting Actress) and the title role in the West End revival of Witness for the Prosecution.

Steadman's debut novel, the psychological thriller Something in the Water, was published in June 2018 by Simon & Schuster UK and Penguin Random House USA. Her second novel, Mr Nobody, was published in January 2020 and her third, The Disappearing Act, in June 2021.  A fourth novel, The Family Game was published in October 2022.

Works
 
 
 
 Steadman, Catherine (2022). The Family Game: A Novel. Ballatine Books. ISBN 9780593158067.

References

External links
 

English television actresses
English stage actresses
English film actresses
Living people
Alumni of the Oxford School of Drama
21st-century English actresses
1987 births
English women novelists